The 2020–21 Grasshopper Club Zürich season is the club's second consecutive season in the Swiss Challenge League, having been relegated from the 2018–19 Swiss Super League one year earlier, after playing in the top tier for 67 years. The season started on 18 September 2020 and is scheduled to end on 30 May 2021. Grasshopper Club Zürich also participate in the Swiss Cup. The first game was played on 12 September 2020.

Review and events
In April 2020 the club was bought by investors from China. The new owners began to reform the club and renew the squad during the summer break, including the signing of several players from Wolverhampton Wanderers. The English Premier League club is also connected to the Chinese investors. The first game of the season was played in late September 2020, a delay caused by the COVID-19 pandemic in Switzerland.

On May 11, 2021 coach João Carlos Pereira was sacked after three defeats in a row. He was replaced by Zoltán Kádár for the last two games of the season.

Thanks to a 2–1 win against Kriens on the last day of the season, Grasshopper Club Zürich was promoted to the Super League.

Squad

Players

Players in italic left the club during the season.

Players out on loan

Transfers

In

Out

Coaching staff

Current coaching staff

until 11 May 2021

Competitions

Overview

Challenge League

Kickoff times are in CET

Swiss Cup

Kickoff times are in CET

Pre-season and friendlies

Statistics

Goalscorers
{| class="wikitable" style="text-align:center"
|-
!width=15|
!width=15|
!width=15|
!width=15|
!width=145|Name
!width=80|Challenge League
!width=80|Swiss Cup
!width=80|Total
|-
!rowspan=1|1
|3
|FW
|
|align=left|Léo Bonatini
|11
|2
|13
|-
!rowspan=1|2
|9
|FW
|
|align=left|Shkelqim Demhasaj
|10
|1
|11
|-
!rowspan=1|3
|10
|MF
|
|align=left|Petar Pusic
|9
|0
|9
|-
!rowspan=1|4
|23
|MF
|
|align=left|Nikola Gjorgjev
|7
|0
|7
|-
!rowspan=1|5
|17
|FW
|
|align=left|Cristian Ponde
|5
|1
|6
|-
!rowspan=2|6
|30
|MF
|
|align=left|Nuno Pina
|3
|0
|3
|-
|31
|DF
|
|align=left|Dominik Schmid
|2
|0
|2
|-
!rowspan=3|8
|8
|MF
|
|align=left|André Santos
|2
|0
|2
|-
|24
|DF
|
|align=left|Toti
|2
|0
|2
|-
|33
|MF
|
|align=left|Giotto Morandi
|2
|0
|2
|-
!rowspan=7|11
|5
|DF
|
|align=left|Aleksandar Cvetković
|1
|0
|1
|-
|14
|MF
|
|align=left|Connor Ronan
|1
|0
|1
|-
|19
|MF
|
|align=left|Nuno da Silva
|1
|0
|1
|-
|34
|DF
|
|align=left|Allan Arigoni
|1
|0
|1
|-
|48
|MF
|
|align=left|Robin Kalem
|0
|1
|1
|-
|89
|DF
|
|align=left|Ermir Lenjani
|1
|0
|1
|-
|90
|FW
|
|align=left|André Ribeiro
|1
|0
|1
|- class="sortbottom"
|colspan=5|Own goals
|0
|0
|0
|-
|colspan=5|Totals
|60
|5
|65

References

External links

Grasshopper Club Zürich seasons
Grasshoppers